Methylocystis heyeri is a Gram-negative, aerobic, methanotrophic and non-motile  bacterium species from the genus of Methylocystis that has been isolated from Sphagnum peat in the Großer Teufelssee in Germany.

References

Further reading

External links
Type strain of Methylocystis heyeri at BacDive -  the Bacterial Diversity Metadatabase

Methylocystaceae
Bacteria described in 2007